DnaJ homolog subfamily B member 1 is a protein that in humans is encoded by the DNAJB1 gene.

A fusion protein of DNAJB1 and PRKACA drives fibrolemallar hepatocellular carcinoma, a type of rare liver cancer.

Interactions 
DNAJB1 has been shown to interact with:
 HSPA4, and
 STUB1

References

Further reading 

 
 
 
 
 
 
 
 
 
 
 
 
 
 
 
 
 
 

Heat shock proteins